Sin miedo a la verdad is a Mexican anthology television series produced by Rubén Galindo for Televisa.

The series has been renewed for a third season.

Series overview

Episodes

Season 1: You Are No Longer Alone (2018)

Season 2: Wake Up (2019)

Season 3: Time to Rise Again (2020)

Notes

References

External links 
 

Lists of Mexican drama television series episodes